This is the filmography of American voice actress Kari Wahlgren.

Voice-over filmography

Anime

Animation

Feature film

Direct-to-video and television films

Direct-to-streaming films

Video games

Live-action filmography

Television

Film

Other appearances
 Swiffer TV commercial – Mud Girl for Swiffer WetJet
 TableTop web series – Herself (season 2, episode 8)

Notes

References

Books cited

Other references
 G4TV "Will Work for Games" Interview with Kari Wahlgren (June 27, 2008) 
 Kari Wahlgren Interview (September 7, 2008) at Voiceacting.co.uk

External links
 
 
 
 Kari Wahlgren, Jennifer Jean and Kay Jensen at CrystalAcids Anime Voice Actor Database
 

Actress filmographies
American filmographies